Since You've Been Gone is a 1998 American comedy film directed by David Schwimmer about a 10th anniversary class reunion. It debuted as a made-for-television movie on ABC in 1998, although it was intended to be released theatrically by Miramax in 1997, as suggested by the credits.

Cast
 Philip Rayburn Smith as Kevin MacEldowney
 Joy E. Gregory as Mollie Rusk
 Joey Slotnick as Zane Levy
 Teri Hatcher as Maria Goldstein
 Jon Stewart as Todd Zalinsky
 Rachel Griffiths as Sally Zalinsky
 Lara Flynn Boyle as Grace Williams
 David Schwimmer as Robert S. Levitt
 Love Jones as the reunion band

Plot

Set in downtown Chicago during one long evening and night, the film follows several characters as they attend a ten-year high school reunion organized by the smarmy Robert S. Levitt (David Schwimmer) who used to be the high school's class president. Among the many guests attending are Kevin MacEldowney (Philip Rayburn Smith), his wife Molly (Joy Gregory) and their friend Zane Levy (Joey Slotnick). Kevin is medical doctor who does not look forward to the reunion ever since he was humiliated on graduation day after being beaten up in a brawl by his rival Pat Prince (Tom Hodges) who is also attending the reunion. Zane is a composer who is trying to make a comeback after a song that he wrote was plagiarized by a national record label, something over which he remains bitter.

Among the guests are Duncan Shepard (David Caitlin) and Clay Mellon (Thom Cox), two mismatched best friends who are having their own life problems. Duncan recently lost his business and tries to sugar-coat his life while he inadvertently helps out others with their own business problems. Clay is a manic depressive at a crossroads with his life while trying to connect with others to find his own life path.

Electra Pollack (Laura Eason) and Holly Petuto (Heidi Stillman) are also best friends attending where the accident-prone Electra tries to find a man to hook up with in order to be her potential new husband, and Holly is book author and self-help therapist who constantly talks about surviving a recent plane crash where she emerged unscathed. Electra and Holly are friends with Maria Goldstein (Teri Hatcher) who has become a wealthy business entrepreneur but who finds her own success to be lonely as well.

Grace Williams (Laura Flynn Boyle) is a demented practical joker who causes various mischief and mayhem at the reunion to anyone who slightly angers or annoys her, and who later hooks up with Clay after they bond over their similar life situations as both of whom hold a personal grudge against Robert Levitt.

The film also features cameo appearances by various actors and actresses whom include Molly Ringwald as a book fan of Holly's; Liev Schreiber as Fred Neff, a solo dancing attendee; Jennifer Grey as Polly Reed, a prescription medication addict; Carlos Jacott as the reunion's bartender; Helen Martin as a rude old lady that Clay and Grace encounter; and Marisa Tomei as Tori, another reunion guest.

Production
Most of the film was shot in downtown Chicago at the Hotel Allegro (then called the Bismarck Hotel) as well as the neighboring Palace Theater where the reunion takes place. Some portions of the film were shot in Palm Springs, California.

References

External links
 
 
 Rotten Tomatoes: Since You've Been Gone

1998 films
Class reunions in popular culture
1998 comedy films
Films set in 1997
Films directed by David Schwimmer